Lamontichthys parakana is a species of catfish in the family Loricariidae. It is native to South America, where it occurs in the lower Tocantins River in Brazil, with its type locality being listed as below the Tucuruí Dam. The species reaches 13.1 cm (5.2 inches) in standard length. Its specific name, parakana, refers to the Parakanã people who inhabit the lower Tocantins basin.

References 

Loricariidae
Fish described in 2009
Catfish of South America
Fish of Brazil